These are lists of films released by the Walt Disney Company and its subsidiaries. They were made by an array of existing, defunct, and divested company units. The lists are organized by business segment: Studio Entertainment, Media Networks and Direct-to-Consumer & International.

Studio Entertainment

The Walt Disney Studios 
Lists of films released by the Walt Disney Studios, the main unit in the Studio Entertainment segment, include:
 Lists of Walt Disney Studios films
List of Walt Disney Pictures films
List of Walt Disney Animation Studios films
List of Pixar films
List of Marvel Studios films
List of Lucasfilm productions
List of 20th Century Studios films
List of Fox Film films
List of Twentieth Century Pictures films
List of 20th Century Fox films (1935–1999)
List of 20th Century Fox films (2000–2020)
List of Blue Sky Studios productions
List of Searchlight Pictures films
List of Fox Searchlight Pictures films (1995–1999)
List of Fox Searchlight Pictures films (2000–2009)
List of Fox Searchlight Pictures films (2010–2019)
List of Touchstone Pictures films
List of Hollywood Pictures films

By format 
List of Walt Disney Animation Studios short films
List of Disney live-action remakes of animated films
List of Disney live-action shorts
List of Disney feature-length home entertainment releases
List of Disney theatrical animated features
List of 20th Century Studios theatrical animated features

Media Networks 
Lists of films released by Walt Disney Television, of the Media Networks segment, include:
 List of Disney television films
 List of Disney Channel Original Movies

Direct-to-Consumer & International 
Lists of films released by Disney+, of the Direct-to-Consumer & International segment, include:
 List of Disney+ original films
 List of Star Studios films

 
Films